Hungry Sally & Other Killer Lullabies is the second studio album by Tito & Tarantula, released in 1999. It is less known than their previous album, Tarantism, but is probably their best known work apart from that.

This album was their first to feature drummer Johnny "Vatos" Hernandez, who had been hired as a percussionist shortly after the release of Tarantism, replacing Nick Vincent. Hernandez, who previously had played in the new wave band Oingo Boingo, provided a more solid, powerful drumming sound for the band, as opposed to Vincent's highly blues-influenced style. The album also featured the departure of multi-instrumentalist Lyn Bertles, who the band chose not to replace, reducing it to a four-piece. Instead, all the violin and mandolin parts were recorded by session musician Petra Haden. The band later elected to hire Andi Figueroa for the position when they went on tour, who played on their next album, Little Bitch, as a session musician.

Track listing
"Bleeding Roses" (Peter Atanasoff, Tito Larriva, Jennifer Condos, Lyn Bertles, Nick Vincent) – 5:48
"When You Cry" (Atanasoff, Larriva, Condos, Johnny "Vatos" Hernandez, Petra Haden) – 5:55
"Love in My Blood" (Atanasoff, Larriva, Condos, Bertles, Vincent) – 3:57
"Slow Dream" (Atanasoff, Larriva, Condos, Bertles, Vincent, Hernandez) – 4:20
"Hungry Sally" (Atanasoff, Larriva, Condos, Hernandez, Haden) – 6:46
"My German Fräulein" (Atanasoff, Larriva, Condos, Bertles, Vincent, Hernandez) – 4:26
"Betcha Can't Play" (Atanasoff, Larriva, Condos, Hernandez, Haden) – 1:34
"Clumsy Beautiful World" (Atanasoff, Larriva, Condos, Hernandez, Haden) – 3:44
"Devil's in Love" (Atanasoff, Larriva, Condos, Hernandez, Haden) – 4:06
"Woke up Blind" (Atanasoff, Larriva, Condos, Hernandez, Haden) – 10:51
"Pieces of Time (All in a Line)" (Atanasoff, Larriva, Condos) – 5:12

A hidden track appears at the end of "Pieces of Time (All in a Line)" entitled "Crucified", written by Larriva and Atanasoff, which pushes the track to a length of 10:39.

Personnel
Peter Atanasoff – lead guitar, backing vocals
Tito Larriva – rhythm guitar, lead vocals, recorder, "one finger" piano, engineer
Jennifer Condos – bass, backing vocals
Johnny "Vatos" Hernandez – percussion, drums, backing vocals

Additional personnel
Petra Haden – violin, mandolin, additional guitar, additional recorder
Chris "Up Yers" Rugulo – additional guitar, additional percussion, assistant engineer, "right hand"
Julian Mack – piano, engineer, mixing, mastering
Scotty Boy – background barking

Production
Sergio Garcia – assistant engineer
Mike Terry – assistant engineer
Chris Ballman – mastering
Andre Recke – executive producer, manager, band photos
Gil Gastelum – "true believer"
Gary Panter – illustrations
Felix Mack – "digital stuff"

1999 albums
Tito & Tarantula albums